Tindhólmur is an islet on the southside of Sørvágsfjørður, west of Vágar in the Faroe Islands. It has its name from the five peaks, which are named Ytsti, Arni, Lítli, Breiði, Bogni (Farthest, Eagle, Small, Broad, Bent). The islet is uninhabited. Formerly, it was a nesting place for the white-tailed eagle.

Eiriksboði
Eiriksboði is a rocky formation stretching out from the islet.

References

External links
 

Islets of the Faroe Islands
Vágar
Uninhabited islands of the Faroe Islands